Usqunta (also spelled Oscconta, Osqonta or Uscunta) is an archaeological site in the Ayacucho Region in Peru. It was declared a National Cultural Heritage by Resolución Directoral National No. 024/INC on January 12, 2009. Usqunta is located in the Lucanas Province, on the border of the districts of Aucara, Cabana and Lucanas.

The prehispanic sites named Usqunta I and Usqunta II are also known as Inti Watana II and Inti Watana III.

References 

Archaeological sites in Peru
Archaeological sites in Ayacucho Region
Mountains of Peru
Mountains of Ayacucho Region